The Law Reform and Development Commission (LRDC) is a government commission established in 1992 in Namibia, that creates reports making recommendations for legal reforms. In 2014, New Era reported that the Ministry of Justice was not seriously following up on reports submitted as far back as 2003. The LRDC is an independent panel of experts from the government that is part of the Commonwealth Association of Law Reform Agencies.

References 

Law reform
Government of Namibia
1992 establishments in Namibia
Law commissions